Yersinia frederiksenii is a Gram-negative species of bacteria. It uses rhamnose and sucrose. Its type strain is strain 6175 (=CIP 80–29). In humans, it can cause gastrointestinal infections, while it has also been found in fish.

References

External links
LSPN lpsn.dsmz.de
Type strain of Yersinia frederiksenii at BacDive -  the Bacterial Diversity Metadatabase

frederiksenii
Bacteria described in 1980